Okanagana arboraria is a species of cicada in the family Cicadidae. It is endemic to the Sacramento River valley of California .

References

Insects described in 1934
Okanagana